Kukovina is a village in the municipality of Tuzla, Tuzla Canton, Bosnia and Herzegovina.

Demographics 
According to the 2013 census, its population was nil, down from 140 in 1991.

References

Populated places in Tuzla